A grid-tied electrical system, also called tied to grid or grid tie system, is a semi-autonomous electrical generation or grid energy storage system which links to the mains to feed excess capacity back to the local mains electrical grid. When insufficient electricity is available, electricity drawn from the mains grid can make up the shortfall. Conversely when excess electricity is available, it is sent to the main grid. When the Utility or network operator restricts the amount of energy that goes into the grid, it is possible to prevent any input into the grid by installing Export Limiting devices.

When batteries are used for storage, the system is called battery-to-grid (B2G), which includes vehicle-to-grid (V2G).

How it works

Direct Current (DC) electricity from sources such as hydro, wind or solar is passed to an inverter which is grid tied. The inverter monitors the alternating current mains supply frequency and generates electricity that is phase matched to the mains. When the grid fails to accept power during a "black out", most inverters can continue to provide courtesy power.

Battery-to-grid
A key concept of this system is the possibility of creating an electrical micro-system that is not dependent on the grid-tie to provide a high level quality of service. If the mains supply of the region is unreliable, the local generation system can be used to power important equipment.

Battery-to-grid can also spare the use of fossil fuel power plants to supply energy during peak loads on the public electric  grid. Regions that charge based on time of use metering may benefit by using stored battery power during prime time.

Environmentally friendly
Local generation can be from an environmentally friendly source such as pico hydro, solar panels or a wind turbine. Individuals can choose to install their own system if an environmentally friendly mains provider is not available in their location.

Small scale start
A micro generation facility can be started with a very small system such as a home wind power generation, photovoltaic (solar cells) generation, or micro combined heat and power (Micro-CHP) system.

Sell to and buy from mains
Excess electricity can be sold to mains.
Electrical shortfall can be bought from mains.

List of countries or regions that legally allow grid-tied electrical systems

Armenia
Australia
Bangladesh
Bosnia and Herzegovina
Brazil
Canada
Chile
Dominican Republic
El Salvador
European Union
Guatemala
India
Iran
Israel
Japan
Jordan
Mexico
New Zealand
Pakistan
Panama
Philippines (via Meralco)
Russia (from Dec 2019)
Singapore
South Africa (Only by arrangement with municipality)
Sri Lanka
United States of America
Venezuela (no legal restrictions)

See also 

 Cost of electricity by source
 Distributed network
 Electric power transmission
 Electranet
 Photovoltaic system
 Grid tie inverter
 Inverter
 Deep cycle battery
 Power outage
 V2G
 Grid-connected photovoltaic power system

References

External links
 
 Grid Tied Solar explained

Distributed generation
Battery (electricity)

Electric power
Low-carbon economy